Margaret Kemarre Turner, also known as M K Turner,  (born 1938 - ) is an Arrernte woman, who belongs to the Akarre people and she is an elder in her community, interpreter, artist and author. She has also being involved with the Institute for Aboriginal Development in Alice Springs where she has taught language, culture and cross-cultural courses.

Early life 

Turner was born nearby the Spotted Tiger Bore of Harts Range, approximately. 215 km north-east of Alice Springs, until her family was moved off the land due to an influx of miners and the creation of a large army base during World War II.

The family were initially moved by the government to the Catholic Church's  Little Flower Mission in 1937 on Charles Creek; nearby The Bungalow.

The family were moved again in 1942, by the army, to the Catholic mission at Arltunga and, within a few years were moved to Santa Teresa Mission, now Ltyentye Apurte, where she started her formal education.

Career 

Turner has had a long career working across Central Australia and some of her key achievements are:

 Acting as a qualified language interpreter 
 Teaching language and culture classes, as well as cross-cultural communication at the Institute for Aboriginal Development
 Working as an Anangkere (traditional healer)
 Being a founding member of Irrkelantye Learning Centre; focusing on inter-generational learning for Arrernte people
 Painting with Irrkerlantye Arts for many years. 
 Being a director of the Apmeraltye Ingkerreka project; developing protocols to protect Arrernte intellectual property in native plants
 An elder to the board of Akeyulerre; the Central Australian Aboriginal Healing centre
 Being an ambassador for Children's Ground
 Working on the "Fifty words that everyone living in Mparntwe should know" project
 Authoring the books listed in works (below).

Everything that Turner has done in her career is with the aim to keep Arrernte country, language and culture strong.

Turner is a mother, grandmother and great-great grandmother.

Works 
Bush Foods : Arrernte Foods of Central Australia: Nhenhe-areye Anwerne-arle Arlkweme Margaret Kemarre Turner, Shawn Dobson, Alice Springs : IAD Press, 1996 life story

Iwenhe Tyerrtye : What It Means to Be an Aboriginal Person Margaret Kemarre Turner, Barry McDonald, Jill Walsh (editor), Margaret Kemarre Turner (translator), Veronica Dobson  (translator), Alice Springs : IAD Press, 2010 selected work life story

Awards 

 1997 Medal of the Order of Australia for her services to the Indigenous Community of Central Australia; particularly in relation to preserving language and culture and working as an interpreter.

References 

1938 births
Members of the Order of Australia
Indigenous Australian linguists
Women linguists
Arrernte elders
Indigenous Australian writers
Australian Aboriginal artists
Living people
Interpreters
Linguists of Pama–Nyungan languages